The 2023 Leagues Cup group stage will begin on July 21, 2023 and end on July 31, 2023. A total of 45 teams compete in the group stage to decide the 30 of the 32 places in the knockout stage of the 2023 Leagues Cup.

Format
In each of the 15 groups, teams play against each other in a round-robin format. The top two teams of each group will advance to the round of 32.

Besides the teams receiving byes, the top-15 remaining teams from each league will be placed into groups in reverse order (for example, the 2nd ranked MLS clubs is drawn against the 16th ranked Liga MX club. The remaining teams (13 MLS and 2 Liga MX) will be drawn into groups and divided into geographical regions.

Tiebreakers
Teams are ranked according to points (3 points for a win in regulation, 2 points for a win in a penalty shootout, 1 point a loss in a penalty shootout, 0 points for a loss in regulation).

Groups

West 1

West 2

West 3

Central 1

Central 2

Central 3

Central 4

South 1

South 2

South 3

South 4

East 1

East 2

East 3

East 4

References

External links

Group stage